
G H I J K L M

G
Gaa-Gal – Gam-Gan – Gar-Gav – Ge-Gn – Go-Gr – Gu-Gy

Gaa-Gal
 G-funk – a style of gangsta rap that heavily uses P-Funk samples (largely recreated and not directly taken from P-funk records) in their music.
 Gaana – upbeat Tamil dance song performed at celebrations
 Gabber – a faster, more anarchistic, style of house music designed to counter the pretentious Dutch house scene of the 1980s
 Gagaku – any Japanese classical music played for the Imperial Court
 Ghana – counterpoint guitar music from Malta, with improvised lyrics.
 Gaita Zuliana – diverse style of Venezuelan folk
 Galant – intentionally simplistic style of Western classical music designed to counter the increasingly complex Baroque music of the 18th century
 Gallican chant – plainsong used during the Gallican rite.

Gam-Gan
 Gamelan – Indonesian classical music
 Gamelan bebonangan – Balinese style of gamelan that utilizes a 7-tone scale and cymbals
 Gamelan degung – Sundanese style of gamelan that uses the pegog scale
 Gamelan gong kebyar – Balinese style of gamelan known for its explosive changes in tempo
 Gamelan salendro – West Javan gamelan
 Gamelan selunding – Balinese style of gamelan
 Gamelan semar pegulingan – Balinese style of gamelan
 Gammaldans – wide variety of traditional Nordic dance music, and modernized versions created by Nordic-Americans
 Gandrung – traditional Indonesian dance music
 Gangsta rap – a West Coast offshoot of hardcore hip hop characterized by themes and lyrics that generally emphasize the "gangsta" lifestyle.

Gar-Gav
 Gar – Tibetan chanting and dancing
 Garba – Gujarati music and dance
 Garage house – heavily polished style of American house
 Garage rock – a raw and energetic style of rock and roll, often practiced by high school bands in garages.
 Garage rock revival – a music revival of garage rock that occurred in the early 2000s.
 Gato – style of music folk dance popular in Argentina and Uruguay
 Gavotte – traditional French dance music

Ge-Gn
 Gender wayang – Balinese style of gamelan
 Geek rock – alternative rock with geeky themes.
 Gelineau psalmody – a style of plainsong developed by Joseph Gelineau that uses regular metre unlike other plainsongs.
 German folk – any folk music performed by Germans
 Ghazal – Arabic (particularly Pakistani) angst-ridden poetry, often accompanied by music
 Ghettotech – fusion of Chicago house, Miami bass, electro, glitch, and techno
 Girl group – any all-female pop or rock group
 Glam metal – a style of heavy metal music popular in the 1980s characterized by its pop music hooks, hard rock-inspired guitar riffs, and glam rock-influenced fashion; pejoratively labeled as hair metal.
 Glam punk – fusion of glam and punk rock
 Glam rock – a style of rock music which included heavy themes of gender-bending and androgyny.
 Glitch – style of EDM based around samples of malfunctioning technology in order to create an intentionally harsh sound
 Gnawa music – Islamic African religious music

Go-Gr
 Go-go – style of funk known for its syncopated rhythms and call-and-response vocals
 Goa trance – fusion of trance music and traditional Indian styles
 Gong chime – any music performed with high-pitched pot gongs, usually Southeast Asian styles
 Goombay – Bahamian drum music
 Goregrind – style of grindcore known for its lyrical focus on gore and forensics
 Goshu ondo – traditional Japanese dance music from the Meiji era
 Gospel music – a style of music derived from spirituals that is known for its strong use of harmony and its usage of call and response.
 Gospel blues – a fusion of gospel music and blues.
 Gothic country - a style of country music rooted in early jazz, gospel, Americana, gothic rock and post-punk.
 Gothic metal – fusion of gothic rock and heavy metal
 Gothic rock – an offshoot of post-punk that is heavily inspired by Gothic art.
 Gothabilly – a music style influenced by rockabilly and goth subculture.
 Gqom – style of house music from South Africa
 Grebo – a short-lived British style of alternative rock from the 1990s.
 Gregorian chant – the central plainsong used by the Roman Catholic Church that is said to be developed by Pope Gregory I; sung in monophonic voices.
 Grime – fusion of hip hop and UK garage
 Grindcore – fusion of death metal and hardcore punk.
 Griot – music performed by West African storytellers
 Groove metal – a style of heavy metal music that took elements of thrash, but played at mid-tempo, making a slower, groovier sound.
 Group Sounds – Japanese pop from the 1961s, inspired heavily by British beat and American bubblegum pop
 Grunge – a style of alternative rock that is heavily influenced by punk rock and heavy metal music and is known for its heavily distorted guitars and angst-ridden lyrics.
 Grupera – American rock-inspired Mexican rock

Gu-Gy
 Guarania – Paraguayan music style also popular in Brazil
 Guajira – Cuban country music, performed in rural communities
 Gumbe – Guinea-Bissaun folk music
 Gunchei – Central American music played to accompany the garifauna dance of the same name
 Gunka – Japanese military music
 Guoyue – modernized Chinese traditional music
 Gwo ka – Guadaloupean drum music
 Gwo ka moderne – modernized style of gwo ka
 Gypsy jazz – Roma-French style of jazz
 Gypsy punk – Romani style of punk rock

H
Ha – He-Ho – Hu-Hy

Ha
 Habanera – African-American style based on Cuban contredanza
 Halling – Norwegian folk music made to accompany the dance of the same name
 Hambo – Swedish folk music made to accompany the dance of the same name
 Hamburger Schule – style of alternative rock based in Hamburg, Germany
 Happy hardcore – incredibly fast, upbeat, and optimistic style of hardcore techno
 Haqibah – Sudanese a capella music
 Harawi
 Hardcore hip hop – an aggressive and confrontational style of hip hop music that originated from the East Coast.
 Hardcore punk – aggressive and confrontational style of punk music.
 Hardcore – a style of electronic dance music originated from techno known for distorted, industrial-esque beats.
 Hard bop – a style of bebop that contains gospel music harmonies, rhythm and blues (as in the blues style) rhythms, and regular blues melodies.
 Hard house – fusion of hardstyle and house music
 Hard rock – a loud, distorted style  and an offshoot of blues rock. hard rock usually maintains the bluesy elements of rock music.
 Hardstep – gritty, heavy style of drum & bass
 Hardstyle – intense, heavy style of EDM known for its heavy kick-drums and reversed basslines
 Hard trance – a heavy, reverberating style of trance music.
 Hasapiko – Greek folk dance music, originating in Constantinople
 Hát tuồng (Hát bôi) – Vietnamese opera

He-Ho
 Heartland rock – a style of roots rock known for its straightforward rock and roll sound and its concern with the American working class.
 Heavy hardcore - a mix of Hardcore punk and Heavy metal 
 Heavy metal music – a technically proficient, aggressive style of music similar to metal except not very smooth, heavy metal music usually abandons the bluesy elements of rock music.
 Hi-NRG – an electronic, uptempo style of disco known for a reverberating, four-on-the-floor rhythm.
 Hill country blues – a style country blues developed in Northern Mississippi which puts strong emphasis on rhythm and percussion, steady guitar riffs, few chord changes, unconventional song structures, and heavy emphasis on the "groove".
 Highlife – Ghanan style that married traditional African forms with Western pop
 Hiplife – a style of music influenced by Highlife and other Ghanaian musical traditions
 Hip hop production – music production for hip hop music.
 Hip hop music – a popular music genre where lyrics are rapped rather than sung and are musically backed by a sampled loop provided by a DJ. 
 Hip house – fusion of hip hop and house music
 Hindustani classical music – Northern Indian classical music
 Hiragasy – style of music and dance performed by troupes of relatives for day-long periods by the Merina people of Madagascar
 Hoerspiel - music  scores from original German radio dramas
 Honky-tonk – a crisp, clean style of country music that is usually played in honky-tonks.
 Hokum – a comedic version of blues where lyrics is centered on making sexual innuendos.
 Honkyoku – religious music performed by Japanese Zen Buddhists
 Hora – Romani folk music
 Hora lungă – improvisational Romani folk music
 Hornpipe – music played to accompany the British naval dance of the same name
 Horrorcore – hip hop known for dark, horror-inspired lyrics
 Horror punk – punk that is lyrically inspired by 1950s horror B-movies, often in an ironic way
 House music – a relaxed, electronic dance music offshoot of disco characterized by repetitive 4/4 beats, rhythms provided by drum machines, off-beat hi-hat cymbals, and synthesized basslines.

Hu-Hy
 Huayño – Peruvian folk music
 Hula – Hawaiian folk music made to accompany the dance of the same name
 Humppa – Finnish jazz style
 Hunguhungu – folk music performed by Garifuna women
 Hyangak – Korean court music from the Three Kingdoms period
 Hymn – any religious song
 Hyphy – fast-paced style of hip hop from the San Francisco Bay Area

I
 Icaro – music sung in healing ceremonies of the Shipibo-Conibo people of Peru
 IDM – more experimental and intellectual style of electronica so called to distinguish itself from the commercialist trends in rave music
 Igbo music – any music performed by the Igbo people of Nigeria
 Illbient – style of  music inspired by dub music in its use of layering and hip hop music in its use of sampling.
 Impressionist music – style of Western art music inspired by the visual arts movement of the same name
Improvised - any music that is made impromptu
 Incidental music – music played in the background of a film or play
 Indian rock – rock music performed by Indians that usually incorporates elements of Indian music into it; related to raga rock, the term Indian rock is usually only applied to Indian rock musicians currently living in India.
 Indietronica – fusion of indie rock and EDM
 Indie folk – a fusion of indie rock and folk music.
 Independent music – any music made outside of major record labels. Independent music that is specifically formed around an idea of remaining on the underground and a DIY ethic is referred to as indie music.
 Indie pop – a melodic, often angst-free and optimistic, style of pop music associated with the indie music scene; related with indie rock.
 Indie rock – an alternative rock style linked to the indie music scene.
 Indigenous music of North America – any music made by the Indigenous peoples of North America.
 Indigenous rock – a style of music which mixes rock music with the instrumentation and singing styles of Indigenous peoples
 Indo jazz – fusion of jazz and traditional Indian music
 Industrial death metal – a style of industrial metal that fuses industrial music with death metal.
 Industrial hip hop – fusion of industrial and hip hop music
 Industrial music – an experimental style of electronic music inspired by punk rock which draws harsh, transgressive or provocative sounds and themes.
 Industrial musical – musical theater performed by the workers of a company to promote teamwork
 Industrial metal – a fusion of industrial music and heavy metal music; usually has heavy metal vocals and guitar riffs and industrial instrumentation.
 Industrial rock – a style of alternative rock that fuses the harsh musical sounds of industrial music and with rock music instrumentation.
 Industrial thrash metal – a style of industrial metal that fuses industrial music with thrash metal.
 Instrumental – music that has no lyrics
 Instrumental hip hop – hip hop music that features little to no rapping.
 Instrumental rock – rock music that features little to no singing.
 Inuit music – any music performed by the Inuit of Greenland and Canada
 Irish traditional music – folk music of the Irish people; part of the Celtic music umbrella.
 Irish rebel music – Irish folk with an emphasis on Irish republicanism
 Isicathamiya – a capella style of singing used by the Zulu people of South Africa
 Islamic music
 Italo dance – an optimistic style of Eurodance that developed in Italy
 Italo disco – style of disco developed in Italy that lead to the creation of modern EDM
 Italo house – Italian house music that followed on from Italo disco

J
Ja-Je – Ji-Ju

Ja-Je
 J-pop – pop music made by Japanese performers
 Jaipongan – music made to accompany the dance of the same name of Sundanese people of Indonesia
 Jam band – a type of band (usually a rock band) that plays long instrumental, often improvised, tracks called 'jams'.
 Jam session – musical improvisation within the context of popular music (i.e. rock).
 Jamaican folk music – folk music originating from Jamaica.
 Jamrieng samai – Cambodian pop music
 Jangle – a sound characterized by undistorted, treble-heavy electric guitars (particularly 12-strings) played in a droning chordal style (by strumming or arpeggiating), giving it an uplifting, 'jangly' sound. This sound is the main focus of an indie/pop rock music style known as jangle pop.
 Japanese rock – rock music made by Japanese performers
 Japanoise – noise music from Japan
 Jarana yucateca – traditional Yucatán dance music
 Jarocho – Mexican dance and song style from Veracruz
 Jawaiian – fusion of Hawaiian traditional music and reggae
 Jazz – a form of music (usually considered a type of popular music, although some forms can be considered art music) that originated in the late 19th and early 20th century in the Southern United States and is known for its heavy use of musical improvisation and brass instruments (especially the saxophone and trumpet).
 Jazzcore
 Jazz improvisation – musical improvisation within the context of jazz.
 Jazz-funk – fusion of jazz and funk music
 Jazz fusion – a style that incorporates rock elements (particularly its backbeat and usage of the electric guitar) into its music.
 Jazz rap – a fusion of jazz and hip hop music; usually contains jazz instrumentation (either played live or sampled from older jazz recordings) and hip hop rhythms.
 Jazz rock – a fusion of jazz and rock music. Sometimes used interchangeably with jazz fusion, jazz rock is usually seen as being a rock style that incorporates jazz elements (particularly its usage of improvisation and brass instruments) into its music.
 Jegog – gamelan played with bamboo-based instruments
 Jenkka – Finnish folk dance music
 Jesus music – style of CCM developed by the American hippie-based Jesus Movement
 Jewish- music made and performed by Jews talking about subjects like Jewish teachings, life, love and many other things. usually they are in Hebrew or in English.

Ji-Ju
 Jig – uptempo Irish folk dance music
 Jing ping – Dominican folk dance music developed by slave during European colonialism
 Jingle – short, catchy song used in advertising
 Jit – Zimbabwean pop music
 Jitterbug – any music that accompanies the dance of the same name
 Jive – swing music used to accompany the African-American ballroom dance of the same name
 Joged – Balinese dance music
 Joged bumbung – fusion of gamelan and joged
 Joik – style of Sami folk music
 Joropo – Venezuelan waltz
 Jota – Spanish folk dance music
 Jug band – a band that plays a style of African-American folk music using household objects such as jugs, spoons, and washboards.
 Jùjú music – Nigerian pop music
Juke - faster than Ghetto House, playing at 160bpm, and makes striking use of unconventional drum patterns which differ wildly from other house styles.
 Jump blues – an uptempo, style of boogie-woogie played with horns and swing music rhythms.
 Jumpstyle – faster style of progressive house
 Jungle music – a style of breakbeat hardcore known for fast tempo, breakbeats, samples, and for being the immediate predecessor of drum and bass.
 Junkanoo – Bahamas folk dance music

K
Ka – Ke-Kh – Ki-Kp – Kr-Kw

Ka
 K-pop - pop music made by Korean performers 
 Kabuki – style of Japanese musical theatre known for its elaborate make-up and costuming
 Kagok – Korean folk music
 Kaiso – a style of Trinidadian music originating from Igbo and Kongo slaves that later developed into calypso music.
 Kalamatianó – Greek folk music
 Kan ha diskan – Breton folk music
 Kanikapila – Hawaiian music
 Kansas City blues – blues performed by Kansas City inhabitants.
 Kantrum – fast-paced Khmer-Thai folk music
 Kargyraa – deep, growling style of Tuvan throat singing
 Kaseko – Surinamese music that fuses African, European, and American styles
 Kachāshī – fast-paced Ryukyuan festive folk music
 Kawachi ondo – Japanese folk music from the Osaka region
 Kawaii metal – Fusion of heavy metal and J-pop
 Kayōkyoku – an early style of J-Pop

Ke-Kh
 Kecak – Balinese folk opera
 Kacapi suling – Sundanese folk music
 Kertok – Malay musical ensemble utilizing xylophones
 Khaleeji – Arab folk music
 Khene – Malay woodwind music
 Khyal – North Indian style of Hindustani classical music

Ki-Kp
 Kievan chant – a liturgical chant common in churches that have their roots in the Moscow Patriarchate; part of the Obikhod.
 Kirtan – Indian drum music performed during Hindu bhakti rituals
 Kiwi rock – rock music performed by New Zealanders
 Kizomba – Angolan dance music
 Klapa – Croatian a capella music
 Klasik – Afghan classical music
 Klezmer – Jewish classical music
 Kliningan – Sundanese folk dance music
 Kolomyjka – tongue-in-cheek Hutsul folk dance music
 Komagaku – Japanese court music from the Heian period
 Kpanlogo – Ghanan folk dance music

Kr-Kw
 Krakowiak – fast-paced Polish folk dance music
 Krautrock – a German style of experimental rock that largely replaced the blues influences of psychedelic rock with electronic music; considered a form of electronic rock.
 Kriti – Indian classical music
 Kroncong – Indonesian folk music utilizing the ukele
 Kuduro – Angolan folk music
 Kulintang – ancient gong music of the Filipinos, Indonesians, Malays, Bruneian, and Timorese
 Kundiman – Filipino love songs
 Kvæði – Icelandic folk music
 Kwaito – South African  music from the 90s with quick tempos
 Kwassa kwassa – Congolese folk dance music
 Kwela – South African skiffle music

L
La – Le-Lo – Lu

La
 Laiko – Greek folk dance music
 Lambada – Brazilian dance music
 Landó
 Latin alternative – alternative rock informed by traditional Latin American styles
 Latin hip hop – hip hop music performed by Latino Americans
 Latin jazz – jazz that incorporates rhythms from Latin music
 Latin metal – a genre of heavy metal with Latin origins, influences, and instrumentation, such as Spanish vocals, Latin percussion, and rhythm such as Salsa rhythm
 Latin music – catch-all term for Spanish- and Portuguese-language popular music
 Latin pop – used either as a catch-all term for any pop music from the Spanish-speaking world, or as a specific term for a fusion of pop music and Latin music
 Latino punk – punk rock performed by Latino Americans
 Latin rock – used either as a term for Spanish- and Portuguese-language rock music, or as a specific term for a style of rock music that incorporates elements found in Latin music
 Latin soul – very soulful music with Latin elements
 Lavani – style of traditional Indian music performed in Maharashtra

Le-Lo
 Legényes – Hungarian and Romanian folk dance music performed by the inhabitants of Transylvania, now modern-day Cluj-Napoca
 Letkajenkka – Finnish folk dance music
 Lhamo – Tibetan folk opera
 Lied – German poems spoken to music
 Light Metal music
 Light music – soft, non-confrontational British orchestral music
 Liquid funk – style of drum and bass with a heavy emphasis on melody
 Lo-fi music – any music recorded at a quality lower than usual.
 Logobi – style of zouglou influenced by the French colonists in the Ivory Coast
 Loncomeo – musical style from the Tehuelche people in Argentina
 Long song – Mongolian folk music in which each syllable is extended for a longer than average period of time
 Louisiana blues – blues performed by inhabitants of the state of Louisiana.
 Lounge music – downtempo music intended to give the listener a sense of being somewhere else, i.e. a jungle or outer space
 Lovers rock – style of reggae fusion known for its romantic lyrics
 Lowercase – an extreme, minimalist style of ambient music consisting of long periods of silence and occasional, very minute sounds.

Lu
 Lu – Tibetan a capella music
 Lubbock sound – fusion of rock and roll and country music from Lubbock, Texas
 Luk Krung – more polished style of luk thung
 Luk thung – Thai folk music
 Lullaby – soothing song sung to young children to lull them to sleep
 Lundu – harmonious style of Afro-Brazilian music

M
Mad-Mam – Man-Map – Mar-Maz – Mb-Me – Mia-Mil – Min – Mo – Mu

Mad-Mam
 M-Base – style of musical thought and composition developed by Steve Coleman
 Madchester – a music scene developed in Manchester that combined alternative rock with acid house. The music itself is often referred to as baggy.
 Madrigal – style of classical singing popular in the Renaissance and Baroque eras
 Mafioso rap – an East Coast style of gangsta rap that focuses on organize crime (i.e. the Mafia) rather than street gang activities.
 Mahori – style of Thai and Khmer classical music
 Makossa – Cameroonian pop
 Malhun – Arab folk poetry
 Maloya – style of folk developed by the slaves on the French territory of Reunion
 Malambo – Argentine and Uruguayan style of folk music dance
 Mambo – a Cuban style of swing music.

Man-Map
 Manaschi – Kyrgyz song recital of the Epic of Manas
 Mandopop – style of C-pop sung in the Mandarin language
 Manele – Romani folk music
 Mangue bit – a Brazilian electronic music genre played in a fast-paced, alternative rock-informed style.
 Manila Sound – fusion of Western rock music and traditional Filipino folk music
 Mapouka – traditional folk dance music of the Aizi, Alladian, and Avikam people of the Ivory Coast

Mar-Maz
 Marabi – South African style informed by blues and jazz
 Maracatu – Brazilian folk dance music
 March
 Mariachi – fusion of Mexican folk music and pop music
 Marrabenta – Mozambican folk dance music informed by Portuguese styles
 Martial industrial – style of neo-folk informed by military marches and militaristic themes
 Martial music – music intended for use in military settings.
 Maskanda – South African folk music
 Marinera – romantic Peruvian folk dance music
 Martinetes – a capella flamenco music
 Mashup – Blend of two or more pre-recorded songs
 Mass – Christian hymns sung by large vocal groups
 Matamuerte – Garifuna folk dance music
 Mathcore – fusion of metalcore and math rock
 Math rock – a rhythmically complex and experimental style of indie rock.
 Maxixe – Brazilian folk dance music
 Mazurka – Polish folk dance music

Mb-Me
 Mbalax – Senegalese folk dance music that combines traditional sabar drumming techniques with jazz, soul, rock, and Latin music
 Mbaqanga – Zulu jazz style that was one of the first South African genres to achieve intertribal recognition
 Mbube – South African a cappella music
 Meditation music – any music created to aid meditation procedures
 Medieval folk rock – style of folk rock that incorporated elements of earlier folk traditions, such as Medieval, Renaissance, and Baroque music, despite what the name may suggest
 Medieval metal – fusion of folk metal and Medieval folk rock
 Medieval music – a period of Western art music ranging from the 6th to 15th centuries.
 Mejoranera – Panamanian guitar music
 Malhun – north African style of classical music that borrows from Andalusian traditions
 Melam – Indian drumming style
 Melisma – a singing technique where a single syllable of text is sung through several different notes in succession.
 Melodic hardcore – style of hardcore punk known for its slower, melodic guitars, juxtaposed with shouted vocals
 Melodic metalcore – fusion of melodic hardcore and metalcore
 Melodic music – any music that utilizes melody, the combination of notes so that they are perceived as a single string of music
 Memphis blues – a style of blues from Memphis.
 Memphis soul – southern soul from Memphis known for its sultry sound and melodic unison horn lines.
 Mento – a style of Jamaican folk music that later developed into ska; heavily conflated with calypso music.
 Merengue music – Dominican folk dance music
 Merengue típico – style of modern merengue that attempts to sound similar to 19th century merengue
 Méringue – Haitian guitar music
 Metal music - Driving and distorted riffs, aggressive drumming, and vigorous vocals
 Metalcore – fusion of extreme metal and hardcore punk; often sung melodically
 Mexican rock music – rock music performed by Mexicans
 Meykhana – Azerbaijani spoken word music
 Mezwed – Tunisian folk music

Mia-Mil
 Miami bass – rave-inspired style of hip hop
 Microhouse – minimalist, stripped down style of house music
 Microsound
 Middle Eastern music – music originating from the Middle East.
 Mini-jazz – rock-inspired meringue music
 Minuet – French folk dance music
 Milonga – Argentine and Uruguayan folk dance music

Min
 Min'yō – Japanese folk music
 Minimal music – a heavily experimental form of music known for its simplicity and repetitiveness. Usually refers to a style of postmodern classical music, although the term have been applied to some genres of popular music (particularly electronica).
 Minimal techno – fusion of techno and minimal music
 Minstrel – American folk music which parodied African-American styles
 Minneapolis sound – a style of funk rock performed and produced by Prince and his associates that contains many other musical elements, particularly new wave music.

Mo
 Modal jazz – jazz that uses musical modes rather than tonal scales and thinking as a framework. 
 Modinha – Brazilian folk music
 Modern rock – any rock music (usually alternative rock) made during or after the 1990s
 Morenada – folk music and dance style from the Bolivian Andes
 Mor lam – Laotian and Thai folk music
 Mor lam sing – fast-paced, sexual, and modernized style of mor lam
 Moombahton – fusion of electro house and reggaeton
 Moombahcore – moombahton incorporating dubstep influences and elements of Dutch house
 Motown – a style of music produced by and named after the famous record label that took elements of pop music (particularly its clean production and usage of catchy hooks) in order to gain mass crossover appeal.
 Montuno – loose term for Cuban music and its derivatives
 Morna – Cape Verdean folk music
 Mozambique
 Mozarabic chant – plainsong used during the Mozarabic rite.

Mu
 Mugham – Azerbaijan classical music
 Mumble rap – A modern style of hip-hop characterized by simplistic and often unintelligible lyrics
 Murga – Uruguayan, Argentinian and Spaniard theatrical music performed during carnival.
 Musette – French folk dance music
 Mushroom Jazz – eclectic genre that draws from downtempo, hip hop, and world styles
 Music drama – an artwork that covers all forms of art
 Music hall – English popular music of the 19th century
 Música criolla – Peruvian music informed by African, European, and Andean styles
 Musica llanero – Venezuelan and Colombian folk music
 Música popular brasileira – loose term for Brazilian pop music
 Musique concrète – heavily experimental orchestral music known for its use of electronic instruments
 Muwashshah – Arabic musical poetry
 Muzak - a style music that is used in malls and elevators

Previous section
 Section A–F

Next sections
 Section N–R | Section S–Z